T.I. & Tiny: The Family Hustle is an American reality television series that airs on VH1 and premiered on December 5, 2011. On May 29th, 2017, the final and 100th episode of T.I. & Tiny: The Family Hustle aired.

Series overview

Episodes

Season 1 (2011–12)

Season 2 (2012)

Season 3 (2013)

Season 4 (2014)

Season 5 (2015–16)

Season 6 (2017)

References

Lists of American non-fiction television series episodes